Parasite Island is a 2019 Philippine fantasy drama television series starring Rafael Rosell, Bernard Palanca, Michael Flores, Bianca Manalo, Ria Atayde and Desiree del Valle. The series aired on ABS-CBN's Yes Weekend! Sunday block from September 8 to December 1, 2019, replacing Hiwaga ng Kambat.

Synopsis
In a remote island village off the coast of mainland Luzon, a legend about mysterious, invasive and parasitic leeches that turn people into zombie-like state intertwines the stories of its past victim, the village man, and the current one, the family of a young father on the edge of falling apart due to a festering infighting.

Cast and characters

Main cast
Rafael Rosell as Jessie Salvacion
Bernard Palanca as Gary Salvacion
Michael Flores as Warren Salvacion
Bianca Manalo as Melba Dimaano
Ria Atayde as Janelle Salvacion  
Desiree del Valle as Queenie Salvacion

Supporting cast 
Liza Lorena as Daria Salvacion
Charlie Dizon as Princess Salvacion
Kaori Oinuma as Lia Dimaano
Althea A. Cuestas  as Sunshine Salvacion
Paulo Angeles as Miggy Salvacion 
Fino Herrera as TJ 
Ian Galliguez as Whitney
Zeppi Borromeo as Otap
Kenken Nuyad as Crispin
Lou Veloso as Andong

Special Participation
Cheska Iñigo as young Daria
Zyren Dela Cruz as young Jessie
Noel Comia Jr. as young Gary
Uno Madrid as young Warren
Junyka Santarin as young Melba
Alvin Fortuna as Tony
Heidi Arima as Rhoda
Art Acuña as Miguel
Niña Dolino as Stephanie

Ratings

Rerun
The show re-aired on Kapamilya Channel on May 8, 2021 to July 31, 2021 replacing Kadenang Ginto: The Golden Comeback and was replaced by the reruns of Hiwaga ng Kambat.

See also
 List of programs broadcast by ABS-CBN
 List of ABS-CBN drama series

References

External links
 
 

ABS-CBN drama series
Philippine horror fiction television series
2019 Philippine television series debuts
2019 Philippine television series endings
Television series by Dreamscape Entertainment Television
Television shows set in the Philippines
Filipino-language television shows
Zombies in television
Fantasy television series